Ascobolus brantophilus is a species of coprophilous fungus in the family Ascobolaceae. It grows on goose droppings.

Ascobolus brantophilus mainly has an Arctic and Subarctic distribution. It described in 1989 from Greenland, Ellesmere Island and Svalbard and has since then been reported from Iceland, the Shetland Islands and the Falkland Islands

References

Pezizales
Fungi described in 1989
Fungi of Iceland
Taxa named by Henry Dissing